Thompson Sound is a sound on the Central Coast of British Columbia, Canada, located on the east side of Tribune Channel and to the east of Gilford Island, part of the Broughton Archipelago.

See also
List of Kwakwaka'wakw villages
List of Indian reserves in British Columbia

References

Central Coast of British Columbia
Sounds of British Columbia